The lake Stoke  (in French: lac Stoke) is the source of Stoke River. This lake is located south of the municipality of Stoke in the Le Val-Saint-François Regional County Municipality (MRC), in administrative region of Estrie, in Quebec, Canada.

Geography 
It is fed mainly by the Beauchêne stream. The outlet of the lake joins the Stoke River. The bacteriological rating of the lake is A, that is to say excellent according to the Ministry of Sustainable Development. It is bordered by route 216 and Chemin du Lac.

References

External links 
 Batrymetric map
 Gouvernement du Québec - Ministère de l'environnement

Lakes of Estrie
Le Val-Saint-François Regional County Municipality